The Huntsville Blast were a minor league professional ice hockey team and member of the East Coast Hockey League (ECHL). The Blast played at the Von Braun Center in Huntsville, Alabama, for the 1993–94 ECHL season. Previously the franchise played as the Roanoke Valley Rampage in Vinton, Virginia, prior to their relocation following the 1992–93 season. Following their lone season in Huntsville, the franchise relocated to Tallahassee, Florida, where they were rebranded as the Tallahassee Tiger Sharks.

As of February 2008, the Blast moniker has been adopted by the women's-only hockey league team in Huntsville.

References

 
Defunct ECHL teams
Defunct ice hockey teams in Alabama
Ice hockey clubs established in 1993
Sports clubs disestablished in 1994
Sports in Huntsville, Alabama
1993 establishments in Alabama
Ice hockey teams in Alabama
1994 disestablishments in Alabama